Stenoparmena crinita is a species of beetle in the family Cerambycidae. It was described by James Thomson in 1864.

References

Morimopsini
Beetles described in 1864